Richard Horatio Blair (born 14 May 1944) is a British trustee and patron who is the only son of English author George Orwell.

Life and works
Blair was adopted by Eileen and Eric Blair (George Orwell), and after their deaths, lived with Avril Dunn (née Blair, Orwell's sister, his legal guardian) and Bill Dunn.

Blair went to Loretto School from 1953 to 1960, and attended the agricultural colleges of Wiltshire College and Scotland's Rural College, before joining Massey Ferguson, where he worked in sales and marketing from 1975 to 1986.  He married Eleanor in 1964 and they have two sons. Blair's stepmother Sonia died in 1980, passing the income from the Orwell estate on to him. In 1985, Blair became the proprietor of Loch Craignish (self-catering) Cottages, which he ran until 2008.

Having sold his business in 2008, Blair dedicated his time to preserving the memory of his father, George Orwell, which he continues today. At the beginning of 2009, Blair published his first account of his life with his father, and spoke publicly for the first time about his childhood, in an interview with D.J. Taylor at the Sunday Times CNA Literary Awards. In the following year, he worked with a group of Orwell academics and enthusiasts, who inspired the founding of The Orwell Society, of which he is both patron and trustee. Two years later, Blair was elected trustee of The Orwell Foundation and Orwell Youth Prize, of which he is a patron.

After 2012, Blair increased his public activity by performing ceremonial roles such as unveiling plaques,  presenting literary prizes, opening international events, making guest appearances on radio and television, and dedicating a statue to his father installed outside Broadcasting House.  Blair is also engaged in more hands-on roles by hosting lectures through both The Orwell Society and The Orwell Foundation, publishing articles, sponsoring the Orwell Prize, and conducting annual guided excursions to his childhood house at Barnhill, where his father wrote Nineteen Eighty-Four.

In 2017, The Orwell Society initiated a series of engagements with the local community in Wigan to increase awareness of Orwell's motives in writing The Road to Wigan Pier, eighty years after the book was first published. Blair participated as one of the narrators in Beyond Wigan Pier, an opera first performed in 2018 aimed at attracting funding for students to attend Music & Drama school, and bringing the community closer to his father.

References 

1944 births
Living people
George Orwell
People educated at Loretto School, Musselburgh
Alumni of the University of Aberdeen